Dyson Hague (1857–1935) was a Canadian evangelical Anglican presbyter, author, and lecturer.

Early life and education
Hague was born in Toronto in April 1857 to Sarah Cousins and George Hague. He was educated at Upper Canada College before earning his B.A. (1880) and M.A. (1881) at University College and his D.D. at Wycliffe College. He was ordained as a priest in 1883, and married Jemima May (née Baldwin) in 1884.

Career
Hague was appointed first rector of St Paul's Church in Brockville, Ontario in 1885, before serving as seventh rector of St Paul's Church in Halifax, Nova Scotia from 1890 to 1897. From 1903 to 1912, he served as rector of Bishop Cronyn Memorial Church in London, Ontario. Hague later served as rector of the Church of the Epiphany and professor of liturgics and ecclesiology at Wycliffe College in Toronto.

Selected works
Among his many publications, Hague was a major contributor to The Fundamentals, which included his essays on higher criticism, atonement by propitiation, and the doctrinal value of the first chapters of the Book of Genesis.

Books

External links
 Bibliographic directory from Project Canterbury

References

1857 births
1935 deaths
Canadian Anglicans